Events in the year 1987 in the Israeli Civil Administration area.

Incumbents

Ehud Barak commander of Central Command responsible for administration on West Bank
Yitzhak Mordechai commander of Southern Command responsible for Gaza Strip

Events
 September 5 – Four Israeli warplanes bomb three PLO guerrilla bases on the outskirts of the Palestinian refugee camp Ain al-Hilweh in Lebanon. Up to 41 people are reported killed in the incident. An IDF spokesman stated that the targets bombed were being used by terrorist cells that were planning raids against Israeli targets.
 October 8 – During a shootout that took place between Israeli security forces and four armed Islamic Jihad guerrillas in the Gaza Strip, all four guerrillas are killed, as well as one Shin Bet officer.
 December 6 – The Israeli businessman Shlomo Takal is stabbed to death at the main shopping square in Gaza City.
 December 8 – Israeli truck driver collides with two taxis carrying workers returning from work in Israel. Four Palestinian from the refugee camp Jabalia in the Gaza Strip are killed in the incident. A rumor which spread among Palestinians that the crash was deliberate and made in retaliation for the murder of an Israeli businessman in Gaza City two days earlier, sparks the First Intifada the next day.
 December 9 – First Intifada begins - violence, riots, general strikes, and civil disobedience campaigns by Palestinian Arabs spread across the West Bank and Gaza Strip. Israeli forces respond with tear gas, plastic bullets, and live ammunition.
 December 15 – In a controversial move and amid Arab protests, Israeli Trade and Industry Minister Ariel Sharon entertained many prominent Israeli figures in a housewarming party in an apartment he rented in the Muslim Quarter of Jerusalem's Old City. The apartment was used by Sharon during his visits in the city while his permanent home was and remained in a ranch in southern Israel.

Deaths

 August 29 – Naji al-Ali, a Palestinian cartoonist, noted for the political criticism of Israel in his works. (born 1938)

References

See also
 1987 in Israel